The Graduation of Jake Moon is a children's book that was written by Barbara Park and published in 2000.  It is appropriate reading material for children aged between 9 and 12.

Plot
This novel is all about Jake Moon's changing relationship with his grandfather.  This was someone he loved for so many years and enjoyed spending time with.  But now Skelly—the grandfather—has Alzheimer's disease and everything has changed for Jake.  Indeed, it is now like Jake is the adult and Skelly is the kid.  More than that, it seems like caring for his grandfather has been very much left up to him and that puts an increased burden on his own life.

One day though, Jake has had enough, and he rebels.  The unthinkable happens and now the question is, has Jake left it too late?  Can he still show his grandfather how much he means to him?  The story reveals the answer.

Praise
 Publishers Weekly gave a starred review to this "memorable" novel narrated by an eighth-grader whose beloved grandfather has Alzheimer's disease.
 School Library Journal recorded that: "This novel demonstrates the horror of Alzheimer's disease, both to the afflicted person and to the loved ones, and it is written in an accessible style that will appeal to a wide audience."

References

2000 American novels
American children's novels
2000 children's books
Books about Alzheimer's disease
Atheneum Books books